China–Yugoslavia relations were historical foreign relations between China and now split-up Socialist Federal Republic of Yugoslavia. For a long period during the Cold War China was critical towards perceived excessive liberalism, too close cooperation with Western Bloc or market socialism of Yugoslavia, therefore the Chinese communists accused the Yugoslav communists of being revisionists, while the Yugoslav communists accused the Chinese communists of being dogmatics. But, the good relations between both socialist states were restored at the end of the 1960s, and improved even more since the Sino-Albanian rupture occurred (the good relations that existed between China and Albania were frozen since 1972 and were definitively canceled in 1978, the cause of said rupture was that the Chinese communists began to be considered as revisionists by the Albanian communists), with the trend of improved relations continuing in relations with successor states, particularly Serbia. In the 1980s Deng Xiaoping's foreign policy resembled Yugoslavia's stance of being non-aligned and non-confrontational and with Hu Yaobang’s 1983 appraisal of ‘Josip Tito's principles of independence and equality among all communist parties, and of opposing imperialism, colonialism, and hegemonism’. All six former Yugoslav republics have memoranda of understanding with China on Belt and Road Initiative.

History

In the short and immediate period after the 1948 Tito–Stalin split and at the end of the Chinese Civil War and the Chinese Communist Revolution in 1949, Yugoslav Communists looked at China for a revolutionary ally in defending "Marxism-Leninism" against Soviet "revisionism." In the fall of 1949, the new People's Republic of China rejected Belgrade's offer to establish diplomatic relations and adopted the Cominform's anti-Yugoslav position. The Chinese position changed in 1955 after Stalin's death when Mao Zedong welcomed the Yugoslavian Communist Union Delegation and self-critically apologized for poor relations in the past, silence and for "times when we let you down".

Following the Sino-Soviet split in late 1960's Beijing invited People's Republic of Albania to moderate its criticisms of Yugoslavia, and to suggest the creation of a Balkan zone (together with Socialist Republic of Romania) to challenge Soviet influence in the region.

President of Yugoslavia Josip Broz Tito visited China for the first time in 1977, followed by a return visit of Chinese Prime Minister Hua Guofeng to Yugoslavia in 1978.

Following the breakup of Yugoslavia and Yugoslav Wars judges Li Haopei, Wang Tieya and Liu Daqun from China served at the International Criminal Tribunal for the former Yugoslavia.

The PRC supported the Federal Republic of Yugoslavia during the Kosovo War and opposed the NATO airstrikes against targets in Serbia and Montenegro. The PRC believed that Slobodan Milošević was acting to prevent the secession of Kosovo by Albanian separatists from the FRY, and thus supported his actions as preserving the FRY's territorial integrity. The PRC opposed NATO intervention in Kosovo on the basis that it set a dangerous precedent that PRC officials believed could in the future afflict the PRC, should riots occur in Tibet or Xinjiang and then result in bombings. PRC opposition to the NATO actions intensified after the bombing of the PR Chinese embassy in Belgrade during the war.

See also
Yugoslavia and the Non-Aligned Movement
World War II in Yugoslavia
China in World War II
United States bombing of the Chinese embassy in Belgrade
China–Croatia relations
China–Montenegro relations
China–Serbia relations
China at the 1984 Winter Olympics

References

China–Yugoslavia relations
Yugoslavia
China
Bosnia and Herzegovina–China relations
China–Croatia relations
China–Montenegro relations
China–North Macedonia relations
China–Serbia relations
China–Slovenia relations